The Polish Speedway Second League or Liga.2 żużlowa is the third division of motorcycle speedway in Poland. It is below the Ekstraliga and the Polish Speedway First League (1.Liga).

Past winners

References 

Speedway leagues
Professional sports leagues in Poland